HFM1 is a gene that in humans encodes a protein necessary for homologous recombination of chromosomes. Biallelic mutations in HFM1 cause recessive primary ovarian insufficiency.

References 

Human proteins